Zhang Jingjing (born December 3, 1988) is a Chinese sport shooter. She placed fourth in the women's 25 metre pistol event at the 2016 Summer Olympics.

References

1988 births
Living people
Chinese female sport shooters
Olympic shooters of China
Shooters at the 2016 Summer Olympics
ISSF pistol shooters
Universiade medalists in shooting
Asian Games medalists in shooting
Asian Games gold medalists for China
Asian Games silver medalists for China
Shooters at the 2014 Asian Games
Medalists at the 2014 Asian Games
Universiade bronze medalists for China
Medalists at the 2013 Summer Universiade